Why Men Don't Listen and Women Can't Read Maps (literally "Why Men Don't Listen and Women Park Badly") is a 2007 German comedy film directed by Leander Haußmann.

Plot 
The successful lawyer and ladies' man Jan (Benno Fürmann) observes through a window of his apartment, how a car scrapes his red convertible. The driver is the equally successful publishing assistant Katrin (Jessica Schwarz). Despite initial mutual accusations, the two soon become a couple. Then the pregnant couple Rüdiger (Jan's brother) and Melanie are  introduced. Subsequently, different hypotheses explaining the behavior of men and women are offered.

References

External links 
 Official Website 
 
 

2007 films
2007 comedy films
German comedy films
2000s German films
2000s German-language films